The SR-556 is a semiautomatic AR-15 style rifle manufactured by U.S. firearms company Sturm, Ruger & Co.  The rifle was introduced in 2009 in  223 Remington/5.56×45mm NATO and as a .308 Winchester AR-10 variant in 2013, the SR-762. It is one of several 21st-century AR-15 rifles to use gas piston operation (SR-556). In January 2016 Ruger discontinued all SR-556 rifles and introduced a new takedown variant with a lightweight KeyMod handguard.

Overview 
The rifle features a "two-stage" piston mechanism as opposed to the semi-direct impingement system of the AR-15. Gas flow is controlled by a four position regulator. Several key parts, such as the short stroke gas piston, gas regulator, and bolt/carrier group are chrome plated. The bolt carrier features an integral lug in place of the AR-15's gas key. The flash suppressor is similar to Ruger's AC-556 and Mini-14GB.

The 5.56 rifle includes a number of other manufacturer's parts such as a Troy Industries railed handguard and Samson folding iron sights, a Hogue rubberized pistol grip, and three Magpul PMAG 30-round STANAG magazines. The 7.62 variant uses SR-25 pattern magazines. The SR-556SC comes with three 10-round magazines and does not have the flash hider or collapsible stock, making it compliant in several states with restrictive rifle laws. In August 2010, Ruger announced that the rifle would be offered in the 6.8mm Remington SPC cartridge. 

Ruger's introduction of the SR-556 was met with some criticism for its high price tag of around US$2,000. Ruger products are usually known for affordability, but the SR-556 is essentially a regular AR-15 albeit with a different, more complicated operating system. It differs from the less expensive alternatives like the Smith & Wesson M&P Sport and Sport II model rifles, of which the original Sport model lacked a forward assist and dust cover. The SR-556 was also criticized for being heavier than other AR-15s.  Ruger addressed these shortcomings by introducing a lighter and less expensive rifle, the SR-556E.

Gallery

See also 
 Ruger AR-556
 Ruger Mini-14
 Ruger 10/22

References

External links 

Ruger official website

.300 BLK firearms
5.56×45mm NATO semi-automatic rifles
Rifles of the United States
Short stroke piston firearms
SR-556
ArmaLite AR-10 derivatives
Weapons and ammunition introduced in 2009